The 1995 California Golden Bears football team was an American football team that represented the University of California, Berkeley in the Pacific-10 Conference (Pac-10) during the 1995 NCAA Division I-A football season. In their fourth year under head coach Keith Gilbertson, the Golden Bears compiled a 3–8 record (2–6 against Pac-10 opponents), finished in a tie for eighth place in the Pac-10, and were outscored by their opponents by a combined score of 286 to 243.

The team's statistical leaders included Pat Barnes with 2,685 passing yards, Reynard Rutherford with 868 rushing yards, and Bobby Shaw with 658 receiving yards.

Schedule

References

California
California Golden Bears football seasons
California Golden Bears football